Ullevål is a neighborhood of Oslo, Norway. It has given name to:

Ullevål Hageby, a residential area south of Ullevål
Ullevål Hageby Line of the Oslo Tramway
Ullevaal Stadion, an association football venue
Ullevål stadion (station) of the Oslo T-bane
Ullevål IL, a local multi-sports team
Ullevål University Hospital
Ullevål sykehus (station) of the Oslo Tramway